The 2018 Ivy League men's basketball tournament was the postseason men's basketball tournament for the Ivy League of the 2017–18 NCAA Division I men's basketball season. It was held on March 10 and 11, 2018, at the Palestra on the campus of the University of Pennsylvania in Philadelphia. Penn defeated Harvard in the championship game to win the tournament and received the conference's automatic bid to the NCAA tournament. Harvard earned an automatic bid to the 2018 National Invitation Tournament.

Seeds
Only the top four teams in the Ivy League regular-season standings qualify for the tournament and were seeded according to their records in conference play, resulting in a Shaughnessy playoff.

Schedule

Bracket

See also
 2018 Ivy League women's basketball tournament

References

Ivy League men's basketball tournament
Tournament
Ivy League Men's B
Basketball competitions in Philadelphia
College basketball tournaments in Pennsylvania